Periploca opinatrix is a moth in the family Cosmopterigidae. It was described by Ronald W. Hodges in 1969. It is found in North America, where it has been recorded from Wyoming.

The wingspan is 9–10 mm. Adults have been recorded on wing in July.

References

Moths described in 1969
Chrysopeleiinae
Taxa named by Ronald W. Hodges
Moths of North America